Don 2: The King Is Back, also known as Don 2, is a 2011 Indian Hindi-language action thriller film written, co-produced and directed by Farhan Akhtar. It is the second installment in the Don reboot series. Jointly produced by Excel Entertainment and Red Chillies Entertainment, the film stars  Shah Rukh Khan as the titular anti-hero, with Priyanka Chopra, Lara Dutta, Om Puri, Boman Irani, Nawab Shah, Alyy Khan, Rajesh Khattar, Sahil Shroff and Kunal Kapoor playing supporting roles. A sequel to Don (2006), Khan appears as the titular character. The film's story takes place 5 years after the previous film when Don (Shah Rukh Khan), a ruthless international drug lord, plans to take over the European drug cartel. Meanwhile, Roma (Priyanka Chopra) has joined the Interpol to hunt him down.

The film's music was composed by Shankar–Ehsaan–Loy, while Javed Akhtar wrote the lyrics. Jason West served as the film's cinematographer and Anand Subaya was its editor. After the success of the first film, Akhtar had planned a sequel in 2010 which did not work out. It was then officially announced in early 2010, with filming scheduled to begin later that year. Principal photography took place in Berlin, where it was shot extensively. To date, this film marks the last directional venture of Akhtar.

Don 2 was released on 23 December 2011 in 2D and 3D formats, which also included dubbed versions in Telugu and Tamil languages. It received mixed-to-positive reviews from critics, receiving praise for its story, cinematography, production design, soundtrack, background score, action sequences and performances of the cast, but criticism for its pacing. At the time of its release, the film was the 2nd highest-grossing Indian film of 2011.

Don 2 received a number of accolades across various ceremonies in India. At the 57th Filmfare Awards, Don 2 received 5 including Best Film, Best Director (Farhan) and Best Actor (Khan), and won 2 awards – Best Action and Best Sound Design.

Plot 
Five years after the events of Don, the European drug cartel bosses meet in the French Riviera on a yacht to discuss a new threat emerging from Asia: Don is jeopardizing their business by undercutting their prices and they decree that he must die. Living in Thailand for the last five years, Don goes to a remote settlement to pick up a shipment of cocaine. He gets cornered by his own allies who reveal to him that once he is killed, the cocaine from Asia will be open for sale in Europe and they will usurp all the profits. Don makes his way out by killing all his allies and destroying the entire settlement. Later, Don returns to Malaysia, surrendering to Roma, who has joined Interpol, and Inspector Malik. He is sentenced to death and sent to prison, where he meets old rival Vardhaan.

Initially, Vardhaan tries to exact revenge on Don for having him imprisoned five years back, he patches up with Don when the latter offers him an opportunity to escape with him. Don and Vardhaan eventually break out by poisoning the other inmates. In Zurich, Don meets trusted companion Ayesha, and they retrieve a tape from a secret locker whose key was under Vardhaan's possession. It shows J.K. Diwan, vice-president of the Euro-printing DZB (Deutsche Zentral Bank) bribing Singhania to kill James Werden, the original choice for the President of the DZB so that Diwan's superior, Fabian Kohl would become the new president. Singhania was killed by Vardhaan five years earlier. Don blackmails Diwan into giving him the bank's blueprints so he can steal the printing plates. Diwan gives him fake blueprints and hires Abdul Jabbar, a deadly assassin. 

However, Don escapes, and with no other choice, Diwan gives him the original blueprints. Roma and Malik arrive in Berlin and unsuccessfully interrogate Diwan, after having found evidence of him being involved with Don in some illegal activity, while Don and his team execute a bank robbery. After stealing the printing plates, Don is betrayed by Vardhaan and Jabbar but escapes. Another team member, Sameer, calls the police on Don and he is arrested. Don blackmails Diwan into giving him German immunity in exchange for erasing the evidence of him being involved in the murder of James Warden. He then negotiates with the German police and Interpol over surrendering the plates and a disc containing details of the European underworld in exchange for the safety of the hostages and defusing the bombs in the bank. 

Don and Roma reach Vardhan after bloody combat with his thugs and find themselves in a standoff. Though ordered by Vardhaan and Jabbar - and even Don himself - Roma is unable to kill Don and is shot by Jabbar in response; she still has feelings for him, even though he killed her brother and his fiancée five years earlier, and also does not want to do it illegally. Don manages to subdue Vardhaan and kills Jabbar. He obtains his immunity papers and surrenders the plates and the disc, as per the bargain. Don brings Roma to an ambulance and they exchange glances before the doors close. When the police later investigates the evidence, they are shocked to discover Diwan and Kohl were behind Werden's murder. Don later detonates a bomb planted earlier in Diwan's car, killing Diwan and seemingly destroying the plates which he had taken. 

In a final scene, it is revealed Don still has the currency plates, the ones which the police believe was destroyed in the explosion were fake. Sameer was actually loyal to Don; informing the police was part of the plan. The disc Don turned over actually contains the names of the European drug cartel. Having been exposed, Kohl is shortly arrested too, and the DZB is forced to replace him. After they are arrested, Don becomes king of the European underworld and tells Ayesha and Sameer they have no idea how rich they will become.

Cast 

 Shah Rukh Khan as Don 
 Priyanka Chopra as Roma Bhagat 
 Boman Irani as Vardhaan Makhija 
 Kunal Kapoor as Sameer "Sam" Ali
 Ally Khan as J. K. Diwan 
 Nawwab Shah as Abdul Jabbar 
 Sahil Shroff as Arjun Shergill 
 Wolfgang Stegemann as Karl Cost (Jabbar's German assistant)
 Om Puri as Inspector Vishal Malik 
 Lara Dutta as Ayesha Kapoor
 Rike Schmid as Yana, Sameer's wife
 Martin Goeres as Jabbar's Goon
 Timo Honsa as Jabbar's Goon
 Christian Maria Goebel as Fabian Kohl
 Günter Barton as James Werden
 Bianca Karsten as Sophie Kohl
 Hans-Eckart Eckhardt as Dr. Schneider
 Klaus Schindler as Commissioner Muller
 Jason West as Jimmy Coogan
 Ridzuan Hashim as Jaruwan
 Adi Putra as Don's Malaysian lawyer
 Hrithik Roshan as Don (disguised face; special appearance)
 Rajesh Khattar as Cartel boss Singhania (archive footage)
 Florian Lukas as Officer Jens Berkel
 Nicolas Walier as SEK officer
 Sten Jacobs as SEK officer

Production

Development 
A sequel was announced in 2007, a year after the release of Don by Farhan Akhtar. However, the film got delayed due to Shah Rukh Khan's shoulder surgery. The original cast reprised their roles except for Arjun Rampal and Ishaa Koppikar; Lara Dutta and Kunal Kapoor were cast in new roles. Akhtar said that he decided to make a sequel to his 2006 film because it "gave him a lot of freedom to explore the character". Khan copyrighted a tattoo of "D" on his arm and grew his hair long for the film.

Khan exercised extensively for the role and performed almost all the stunts by himself. Don 2 marked Khan's return to playing villains after earlier films such as Darr and Baazigar. Chopra learned martial arts and trained for over two months. Boman Irani lost 12 kg for the role and grew a beard to make his character look "cold, cunning and deceitful"; he felt that playing a villain was "a big stretch" for him as an actor. Dutta was cast after Koppikar, who played the role in Don, dropped out of the film. She was recommended to Akhtar by Khan, who had worked with her on Billu in 2009. However, her role was changed after her casting, and turned out to be a different character than Koppikar's. In an interview with The Hindustan Times, Dutta said that it was exciting to play a new character, since there would be no predecessor to live up to.

Filming 

The principal photography of Don 2 began in October 2010 in Berlin, becoming the first Hindi film to be shot there. The decision to shoot in the city was made after Khan attended the Berlin International Film Festival for its screening of My Name is Khan and realised that the city provided the required realistic backdrop for the film. Before shooting began the German government announced the film on its website, promising support and co-operation during filming. A 70-member Indian crew travelled to the city for two weeks of preparation for shooting. Scenes were filmed at the Brandenburg Gate, the Alexanderplatz, the French Cathedral and the East Side Gallery. The German government provided €3 million in incentives to the film's producers, since it was shot in Berlin. The shoot cost €6.8 million.

Khan experimented with several looks and performed his own stunts in the film. In Berlin, he performed a 300-foot jump for a scene. A car-chase scene using 67 cars closed main thoroughfares (including the Brandenburg Gate) for three weeks. Each day, alternate routes were provided around roads cordoned off for filming. The shooting schedule also included a special appearance by Hrithik Roshan, whose presence was kept under wraps by filmmakers. In December 2010, the Berlin shooting ended. In February 2011 the actors flew to Malaysia, where several scenes were shot in Malacca Prison with prisoners as extras. A section of the prison block was made available for filming, with special T-shirts distinguishing crew members from prisoners in the high-security zone. Khan trained with Hollywood stunt and fight director Wolfgang Stegemann, who also played Karl in the film.

In September 2011, filming resumed on a song featuring the two leads. Another song was shot with Khan in Goa in late November, only a month before the film's release. The song was shot as an action sequence, but did not appear in the film. In August 2011, the producers said they will release Don 2 in 3D. The idea of 3D conversion occurred to Akhtar while shooting; after tests in Los Angeles, it was decided to convert the entire film. The director of photography had used special lenses, which made conversion easier. Sidhwani said that the idea of converting the film into 3D came to him after seeing Harry Potter and the Deathly Hallows – Part 2. Chuck Comisky, a veteran S-3D innovator who supervised 3D stereo and visual effects for Avatar and Sanctum, was given the job. Anand Subaya was the editor and Jason West served as the director of photography. The digital intermediate and VFX of Don 2 were by Pixion Studios, and the 3D conversion by Reliance Mediaworks.

Soundtrack 

The soundtrack was composed by Shankar–Ehsaan–Loy, with lyrics penned by Javed Akhtar. The album contains nine compositions: four original songs, two instrumentals, a dialogue snippet, and two remix out of four original songs. The vocals were performed by Vishal Dadlani, Anusha Mani, Usha Uthup, Shankar Mahadevan, Sunitha Sarathy, KK and Caralisa Monteiro. It was released on 16November 2011 by T-Series.

The soundtrack received mixed reviews from critics. Jaspreet Pandohar called it "safe" and a "disappointment". Joginder Tuteja gave a rating of three out of five, terming it a mixed bag and wrote "There isn't anything which comes across as memorable enough to be played a few months down the line, leave aside a few years. Eventually what you get is a soundtrack that would go along with the narrative and acts as a good situational ingredient but that's about it."

Koimoi also gave three out of five writing that album fall short of expectations. Sukanya Verma of Rediff.com gave the album a rating of two out of five calling it "safe and self-conscious" and wrote "Don 2's music could fare much better if the composers Shankar-Ehsaan-Loy had tried to step out of the prequel's shadow."

Track listing

Marketing 

Distribution rights in Tamil Nadu and Kerala were bought by Sudha Screen's Sreeraj for an undisclosed price. The theatrical trailer and poster for Don 2 were released with Zindagi Na Milegi Dobara. A second trailer was released online on 24 October 2011. The film previewed at the Dubai International Film Festival. The producers collaborated with McDonald's and Café Coffee Day in 20 cities to provide free Internet access with Wi-Fi in their stores so that viewers could watch songs in 3D on their computers.

The producers decided to publicize the dialogue from Don 2 by releasing 10 lines delivered by Don as "Don Says...": one line each Friday from 15 October until the film's release on 23 December. The lines were released simultaneously across all media platforms: television, print, radio, Internet and mobile. The filmmakers also released a limited-edition toy version. The toy, Shahrukh Khan dressed as Don, is the first bobblehead of a Bollywood star. The cast, director and producers embarked on a multi-city tour across India (including Patna) to promote the film. Interrupted by security problems, the tour resumed from Nagpur to Ahmedabad, Hyderabad and other cities.

In October 2011 a comic book based on Don 2, Don: The Origin, was published that was about Don's past. Excel Entertainment collaborated with India's largest video-game company, Gameshastra, on a console game. The firm developed a third-person action-adventure console game in which the player performs actions similar to Don's in the film. A social game, Don – The Social Mobsters Game (developed by Mango Games), was launched on Facebook. It is available on Android and PSN for PlayStation 3 platforms. Sidhwani said, "This is the first time a game is based on an Indian film that will be launched on four platforms. For an iconic character like Don, I think this was the best way to keep the hysteria going amongst his fans." A PlayStation 2 game, Don 2: The King is Back, was released in India in February 2013 to tie in with the film, also serving as the final PAL game for the console.

Release 
Don 2 was released worldwide 23 December 2011 on 3,105 screens in the domestic market, including 500 prints in 3D, and on 650 screens in 40 countries. The dubbed versions in Telugu and Tamil were released with the Hindi version. The second phase of the film's international release began in January 2012 in 84 countries. On 9 February 2012 to 19 February 2012, Don 2  11 February 2012 World Premiere Cinema theatre was shown at the 62nd Berlin International Film Festival. Reliance Entertainment obtained a "John Doe" order from the Delhi High Court allowing it to serve cease-and-desist notices on film pirates.

A month before Don 2s release Nariman Films, producers of Don, sent a legal notice to Reliance and Excel Entertainment about the sequel. According to the notice, Nariman had given the rights to Excel Entertainment in perpetuity for Don alone. On 19 December, a week before Don 2s release, the Bombay High Court refused to stay the film's release; the court's ruling considered the film's scheduled release on 21 December overseas and 23 December in India, for which many theaters had been booked.

The smoking scenes in the film came with a disclaimer per Health Ministry's advice to the producers. The DVD was released on 7 February 2012 with two different versions, Blu-ray and a special feature releasing on 10 April and 24 May.

Reception

Critical response

Don 2 received mixed-to-positive reviews from critics. , the film holds a 69% approval rating on review aggregator site Rotten Tomatoes, based on thirteen reviews, with an average rating of 6.68 out of 10. Nikhat Kazmi of The Times of India called it "a classic action/crime thriller that doesn't let go, even for a moment. More importantly, the plot has been finely crafted, with every twist and turn falling into place like a complicated albeit neat little jigsaw." Rachit Gupta of Filmfare praised the performances by Khan, Chopra and Irani and wrote "They carry the film through its flat moments. It's not very taut, but Don 2 serves up enough thrills in the finale and that alone makes it worth a watch." Priya Joshi of Digital Spy gave the film four out of five, praising its dramatic conclusion which she thought was brilliantly executed, and wrote that it "is a thoroughly exhilarating action-fest, fashioned in a Bollywood-style – and a shot of adrenaline amidst the usual elf-inspired festive film fare."

A review carried by The Express Tribune called the film "a visual masterpiece", adding that "it sets a very high benchmark for future Indian action films." Komal Nahta rated the film 3.5 out of 5 calling it "a winner" but felt that the first half was slow-paced. Taran Adarsh of Bollywood Hungama gave the film 3.5 out of 5, feeling that the second half took the film to another level, and wrote "Farhan chooses an entirely new concept, garnishes it with classic action, stunning visuals, giving it an international look and feel".  Aniruddha Guha of Daily News and Analysis gave three out of five complimenting Khan's performance and action sequences, which he thought made the film work. Mid-Day gave it 2.5 out of 5, praising Khan's performance and wrote "The film is slick, the cinematography is captivating but the racy, edge of the seat pace that you expect from an action thriller of this kind is sorely missing."

Raja Sen of Rediff.com termed the film as "a glossy, unashamed action offering polished within an inch of itself, visually coming together seamlessly and effectively." Sen also added that "although the film has been impressively produced, it has been let down by the over-the-top acting by Khan, while other actors were underused and were given nothing much to do." Rajeev Masand gave the film two out of five stars, calling it "spectacularly boring", and wrote "Don 2 is nicely shot, and there are moments where Shah Rukh Khan is riveting. But that's not enough to hold your interest for well over two hours…even the actor's most loyal fans will find themselves yawning." Sonia Chopra of Sify also gave 2.5 out of 5, feeling that the original film was better as compared to the sequel but praised the action sequences, writing "The car chases are superb and will have you at the edge of your seat. For the rest of the film though, you'll be slouching on that very seat, waiting for the thrills that the Don series promises." Writing for Hindustan Times, Mayank Shekhar was disappointed with the film, calling it "never ending" and criticized the stretched storyline. Sudhish Kamath of The Hindu said "The editor wishes his studio exploded and didn't have to put this together. But he's getting a fat cheque. He does his job to the best of his ability and is almost done when he hears that line “Don Ko Pakadna Mushkil Hi Nahin...”"
 
Among the overseas reviewers, Lisa Tsering of The Hollywood Reporter wrote: "Shah Rukh Khan's foray into bad-boy territory is all swagger with not much substance." David DeWitt of The New York Times called it the "slick cousin" of  "Mission: Impossible and Ocean's Eleven".

Box office

Domestic 
On its first day, Don 2 had 80-percent occupancy levels throughout India. In multiplexes its occupancy level was 75%-80% percent and 70–75 percent in single-screen theatres. The film grossed  from its Hindi version, in the process becoming the third-highest opening-day grossing Indian film (fourth-highest for the Hindi version) and the highest opening-day grossing film on a non-holiday Friday. The film increased its earnings by about 20–25 percent in high-end cinemas during its second and third days, aided by a sizeable increase in multiplex revenue. Over the weekend, Don 2 grossed  from its Hindi version and another  from its Tamil and Telugu versions. During the film's second weekend, Don 2 grossed  from its Hindi version. The second-week total of Don 2 was the second-highest of 2011, after Ready. By the end of its theatrical run the Hindi version of Don 2 grossed  in India and regional versions added a further 60 million for a grand total of  including Tamil and Telugu, making it the highest-grossing Bollywood film of 2011.

International 
Don 2 was released overseas in two phases, with most major markets covered in the first phase. The film set several records on its opening day. It grossed $550,000 from 164 theatres in the United States. In the United Kingdom, Don 2s revenue debuted in the top ten, earning $527,000 in three days from 76 theatres; in the Middle East, the film grossed $930,000 in two days. It broke the record for the highest single-day revenue in Australia ($62,000), grossing $136,000 in Australia, New Zealand and Fiji during the first two days of its run.

The film grossed  during its first week in Pakistan, breaking all previous records. Don 2 grossed  over the weekend, and  during its first week. It set a record for the all-time biggest opening week for a Hindi film in North America, earning $2.64 million. The film was the highest-grossing Bollywood film overseas in 2011. During the second phase of its release, which began in February 2012, Don 2 earned $112,027 in Germany and $5,041 in Austria. It grossed $11.24 million on the overseas market and was the third highest-grossing Bollywood film overseas at that time, after My Name Is Khan and 3 Idiots.
It faces stiff competition with Mission Impossible Ghost protocol in its initial weeks which in some started topped the box office.

Accolades

Sequel 
About a sequel, Shah Rukh Khan said: "It would be great to revisit Don after some time. I’ve told Farhan that we could take 60 days out of our schedule and make a Don 3. But we need a script first, one that could take the last 10 minutes of Don 2 forward to another differently exciting thriller." Farhan Akhtar also expressed a desire to take the story forward, and said he was fascinated by the character of Don. However, the filmmaker wanted to explore other genres without restriction and added that he was currently focusing on his acting career.

In August 2014, it was reported that Farhan Akhtar planned to play a role in the film. In October 2015, Akhtar said that Don 3 will go on floors by late 2016. However, the film is at the scripting stage. It has also been reported that Katrina Kaif will replace Priyanka Chopra in the next installment. But the makers denied this, stating that the only constant in the third installment will be dependent on Don, the rest of the characters, and the script.

See also 
 List of highest-grossing Indian films

References

External links 

 
 Don 2 at Bollywood Hungama
 

2011 films
2010s heist films
2011 action thriller films
2011 crime action films
Indian action thriller films
Indian crime action films
Indian sequel films
Indian heist films
Indian 3D films
2011 3D films
Films shot in Germany
Films set in Berlin
Films shot in Malaysia
Films set in Malaysia
Films shot in Goa
Films shot in Mumbai
Films about criminals
Films about the illegal drug trade
Films scored by Shankar–Ehsaan–Loy
Red Chillies Entertainment films
Girls with guns films
Films directed by Farhan Akhtar
Films about the Narcotics Control Bureau